Bluffton is a city in Harrison and Lancaster townships, Wells County, in the U.S. state of Indiana. The population was 10,308 at the 2020 census and the estimated population is 10,431. The city is the county seat of Wells County. It is also part of Fort Wayne, Indiana's metropolitan area.

History
Bluffton was platted in 1838 and incorporated in 1851 with 850 people, it was named for river bluffs near the original town site. The Bluffton post office has been in operation since 1839.

The City of Bluffton is nicknamed the "Parlor City" for its history of having some of the first clean paved streets in the area during the time of the Trenton Oil boom. Most streets at the time were dirt. The nickname came from the fact that the parlor in someone's home at the time would be the cleanest room in the house because that is the first space that your guests see when they come into your home.  Entering downtown today, the brand new Parlor City Plaza acts as the first thing you see, along with the historic courthouse, justifying the "Parlor City" nickname.

The City of Bluffton is also known for its historic residences throughout downtown, especially north of the area on Main Street.  It was a major piano manufacturing town, and was home to nationally-renowned iris hybridizers, E.B. and Mary Williamson.  

It is also home to the Bluffton Free Street Fair.

Bluffton was included in the corporate name of the short-lived Cincinnati, Bluffton and Chicago Railroad, founded in 1903.  The railroad's Bluffton bridge collapsed on May 22, 1913, and the struggling carrier went out of business shortly thereafter.

Bluffton is one of the first towns in Indiana, and across America, to both publicly acknowledge its history of exclusion as a sundown town and to promote itself as an inclusive town. In 2006, Bluffton was featured in USA Today as an inclusive town that was putting up welcoming, inclusive signs at all local schools as well as at the entrances of three state highways. Mayor Ted Ellis was noted in the article for his helping Bluffton become one of the first to join the National League of Cities' Partnership for Working Toward Inclusive Communities.

The Stewart-Studebaker House, Villa North Historic District, and Wells County Courthouse are listed on the National Register of Historic Places.  The John A. Grove House is formerly listed.

Geography
Bluffton is located at  (40.737991, -85.172223).

Demographics

2010 census
As of the 2010 census, there were 9,897 people, 4,112 households, and 2,585 families living in the city. The racial makeup of the city was 96.0% White, 0.7% African American, 0.4% Native American, 0.5% Asian, 1.3% from other races, and 1.1% from two or more races. Hispanic or Latino of any race were 3.3% of the population.

There were 4,112 households, of which 31.3% had children under the age of 18 living with them, 46.9% were married couples living together, 11.3% had a female householder with no husband present, 4.7% had a male householder with no wife present, and 37.1% were non-families. 32.4% of all households were made up of individuals, and 13.4% had someone living alone who was 65 years of age or older. The average household size was 2.34 and the average family size was 2.93.

The median age in the city was 38.3 years. 24.6% of residents were under the age of 18; 8.8% were between the ages of 18 and 24; 24.3% were from 25 to 44; 25.3% were from 45 to 64; and 16.9% were 65 years of age or older. The gender makeup of the city was 48.0% male and 52.0% female.

2000 census
As of the 2000 census, there were 9,536 people, 3,922 households, and 2,517 families living in the city. The racial makeup of the city was 97.65% White, 0.34% African American, 0.22% Native American, 0.24% Asian, 0.07% Pacific Islander, 0.79% from other races, and 0.69% from two or more races. Hispanic or Latino of any race were 2.35% of the population.

There were 3,922 households, out of which 30.4% had children under the age of 18 living with them, 50.2% were married couples living together, 10.7% had a female householder with no husband present, and 35.8% were non-families. 31.4% of all households were made up of individuals, and 13.4% had someone living alone who was 65 years of age or older. The average household size was 2.35 and the average family size was 2.96.

In the city, the population was spread out, with 25.0% under the age of 18, 9.6% from 18 to 24, 27.7% from 25 to 44, 20.6% from 45 to 64, and 17.2% who were 65 years of age or older. The median age was 37 years. For every 100 females, there were 90.1 males. For every 100 females age 18 and over, there were 86.4 males.

The median income for a household in the city was $37,416, and the median income for a family was $45,294. Males had a median income of $33,088 versus $22,018 for females. The per capita income for the city was $19,118. About 6.4% of families and 9.0% of the population were below the poverty line, including 12.8% of those under age 18 and 10.3% of those age 65 or over.

Education

Bluffton Harrison Metropolitan School District 

Northern Wells Community Schools District 

Bluffton has a public library, a branch of the Wells County Public Library.

Notable people
 Adam Ballinger, basketball player
 Randy Borror, member of Indiana House of Representatives
 Joseph S. Dailey, Justice of the Indiana Supreme Court
 Charles Clemon Deam, botanist; born in Bluffton in 1865
D Wayne Eskridge NFL American football player
 Chandler Harnish, quarterback, MVP of 2010 Humanitarian Bowl, NFL draft's 2012 "Mr. Irrelevant"; born in Bluffton
Verdi Karns, ragtime composer, born in Bluffton in 1882
 Don Lash, champion long-distance runner, won 1938 James E. Sullivan Award as top amateur athlete in U.S.; born in Bluffton in 1912
 Daniel Patrick Moynihan, former U.S. Senator from New York, former U.S. Ambassador to United Nations, former ambassador to India
 Everett Scott, former Baseball player and member of the New York Yankees first World Series championship team 1923 and member of the Boston Red Sox Hall of fame.
E.J. Tackett, professional ten-pin bowler
 Robert Tonner, fashion designer and doll artist; born in Bluffton in 1952

References

External links
 City of Bluffton, Indiana website

Cities in Indiana
Cities in Wells County, Indiana
County seats in Indiana
Fort Wayne, IN Metropolitan Statistical Area
Sundown towns in Indiana